Sam Browne may refer to:

Sam Browne (1824–1901), British Indian Army general
Sam Browne belt, item of clothing named for Sir Sam Browne
Sam Browne (musician) (1898–1972), British dance band singer

See also
Samuel Browne (disambiguation)
Sam Brown (disambiguation)
Samuel Brown (disambiguation)